Edward Charles Holligan (26 March 1878 – 22 November 1964) was an Australian rules footballer who played with Geelong in the Victorian Football League (VFL).

Notes

External links 

1878 births
1964 deaths
Australian rules footballers from Geelong
Geelong Football Club players